Valentine Anthony Neil "Tony Van" Bridge CM (28 May 1917 – 20 December 2004) was a British television and theatre actor and director.

Early life
Bridge was born in London and first appeared as a child actor at the age of ten, and enrolled aged 19 at the Royal Academy of Dramatic Art.

He married Kippe Cammaerts just before World War II. They had two children, Pieter and Michael. While he was away during World War II, his wife met Jack Morpurgo and started a relationship with him. Bridge returned to England in 1946 and shortly thereafter decided to emigrate to Canada.

Bridge had three further children in Canada – Shona Bridge, David Cheyne and Peter Cheyne.

Career
Bridge worked for 15 years with the Stratford Shakespeare Festival, and 30 years with the Shaw Festival. He was interim artistic director at Shaw for the 1974–75 season.

On 27 April 2000, Bridge was made a Member of the Order of Canada for his services to the performing arts.

Bridge died 20 December 2004 in Niagara-on-the-Lake, Ontario. He was survived by his ex-wife Stacey and predeceased by his second wife Elizabeth Bridge.

Television (partial)
 The Quatermass Experiment (1953), producer
 The Avengers (1961), Henry Burge
 Playdate (1961–62)
 "Masterpiece" (1961), Raiyler
 "Love Story 1910" (1962), Inspector Dew
 "Great Expectations" (1962), Magwitch
 "The Old One" (1962) (and writer)
 Mission: Impossible (1969), Erhard Poltzin
 A Population of One (1980)

References

1917 births
2004 deaths
Alumni of RADA
Male actors from London
English male television actors
English male stage actors
Members of the Order of Canada
Canadian theatre directors